Flint Hill is a small village in County Durham, in England. It is situated to the north of Annfield Plain.

References

Villages in County Durham